Tolga is a Turkish-origin given name meaning "war helmet" or “the rising”. It is also an Australian Aboriginal term for “red volcanic soil”. Also in Hazara (Turkic people Native to Central Afghanistan) language it means crown (the crown of your head) The name is used mostly for males. It may refer to:

People
Notable people with this name include:
 Tolga Ciğerci, Turkish-German footballer
 Tolga Çevik, Turkish actor 
 Tolga Doğantez, Turkish footballer
 Tolga Geçim (born 1996), Turkish basketball player
 Tolga Akcay (Author), Author of The Blockchain Compass
 Tolga Örnek, Turkish film director
 Tolga Seyhan, Turkish footballer
 Tolga Uprak, Turkish motorcycle racer
 Tolga Zengin, Turkish footballer

Middle name
 Orçun Tolga Karaoğlanoğlu (born 1987), Turkish kayaker

Variants
 Tulga
 F. Tulga Ocak, Turkish academic

See also

Tola (name)
 Tolga (disambiguation)

References

Turkish masculine given names